Miroslav Janíček (born 13 May 1974) is a Slovak weightlifter. He competed in the men's lightweight event at the 2004 Summer Olympics.

References

1974 births
Living people
Slovak male weightlifters
Olympic weightlifters of Slovakia
Weightlifters at the 2004 Summer Olympics
People from Dolný Kubín
Sportspeople from the Žilina Region